The Puerto Rican Figure Skating Championships are the figure skating national championships held annually to crown the national champions of Puerto Rico. Skaters compete in the disciplines of men's singles and ladies' singles across the levels of senior (Olympic-level), junior, novice, intermediate, and juvenile. Not every event has been held in every year due to a lack of entries. The National Championships are organized by the Puerto Rican Figure Skating Federation. The Puerto Rican Figure Skating Federation is not affiliated with the Puerto Rico Olympic Committee (In Spanish, Comite Olimpico de Puerto Rico), and therefore can not represent Puerto Rico internationally or compete in the Winter Olympic Games. Although the Puerto Rican Figure Skating Federation became a member of the International Skating Union, the Puerto Rico Olympic Committee has not recognized it, nor is listed in the Puerto Rico Olympic Committee website. The Puerto Rican Figure Skating Federation is essentially a club seeking recognition by the Puerto Rico Olympic Committee. Created and formed by the family of the first Puerto Rican figure skater Kristine Stone Cruz (who trained in the Ice House in Hackensack New Jersey). She held the title 2 years in a row. Kristine is now coaching as well as skating in Omaha, Nebraska at the Ralston Arena.

Puerto Rico became a provisional member of the International Skating Union in 2004 and has been a full member since October, 2006.

References

External links
 Champions information
 2008 Puerto Rican Figure Skating Championships
 2007 Puerto Rican Figure Skating Championships
 2006 Puerto Rican Figure Skating Championships
 2005 Puerto Rican Figure Skating Championships
 2004 Puerto Rican Figure Skating Championships
 2003 Puerto Rican Figure Skating Championships
 
 
 

 
Figure skating in Puerto Rico
Figure skating national championships